Yanychi is a rural locality (a selo) in Bershetskoye Rural Settlement, Permsky District, Perm Krai, Russia. The population was 560 as of 2010. There are 38 streets.

Geography 
Yanychi is located 42 km south of Perm (the district's administrative centre) by road. Kukushtan is the nearest rural locality.

References 

Rural localities in Permsky District